The Covento de San Gil currently houses the Cortes of Castilla-La Mancha (the parliament). It was a convent and currently a government building located in the city of Toledo (Castile-La Mancha, Spain) dating to the 17th century. The Dicalced Franciscans, or gilitos, arrived in this city in the middle of  the 16th century, and established it in 1557 in the vicinity of the Ermita de la Virgen de la Rosa. Later, in the early-17th century, two brothers, Francisco and Juan de Herrera, donated to the friars 16,000 ducats for the construction of the new convent.

The works began in 1610, and the master of masonry Martínez de Encabo promised to complete the church and the convent in four years.

Very likely the tracerist of the work was Juan Bautista Monegro, who, with Martínez de Encabo, worked in the iglesia de San Pedro Mártir.

The convento de los Gilitos, as it is locally known, is a notable example of the simplicity and sobriety of the Toledan architecture of the early 17th century.

The provincial prison of Toledo was installed in the building in 1863,  remaining there  until 1931. Then was a barracks for the Guardia Civil and after, a fire station. Since 1985 the convent is the seat of the Cortes of Castilla-La Mancha.

The building consists of two areas: the church, located on the east facade, and the convent area, which is distributed around a courtyard. All of these forms are a large rectangle.

See also
Cortes of Castilla-La Mancha

References

External links

Cortes of Castilla-La Mancha website

Defunct prisons in Spain
Government buildings completed in the 17th century
Seats of Spanish regional legislatures
Defunct fire stations